The 1973 EuroHockey Club Champions Cup was the fifth and last unofficial edition of Europe's premier field hockey club competition. It took place in Frankfurt as a group stage, which was won once again by SC 1880 Frankfurt.

Standings
  SC 1880 Frankfurt
  SV Kampong
  Rot-Weiss Köln
  Royal Léopold Club
  Club Egara
  Warta Poznań
  Lyon
  Slavia Prague
  Hounslow HC
  Rot-Weiss Wettingen
  HC Vigevano
  Huovit Helsinki

References

See also
European Hockey Federation

EuroHockey Club Champions Cup
International field hockey competitions hosted by Germany
EuroHockey Club Champions Cup
EuroHockey Club Champions Cup
1973 in European sport